Henry Lee Lucas (August 23, 1936 – March 12, 2001) was an American convicted serial killer. Lucas was convicted of murdering his mother in 1960 and two others in 1983. He rose to infamy while incarcerated for these crimes when he falsely confessed to approximately 600 other murders to Texas Rangers and other law enforcement officials. Many unsolved cases were closed based on the confessions and officially attributed the murders to Lucas, and he was considered the most prolific serial killer in history. Lucas was convicted of murdering 11 people and condemned to death for a single case with a then-unidentified victim, later identified as Debra Jackson. An investigation by the Dallas Times-Herald newspaper showed that many of the murders Lucas confessed to were flatly impossible for him to have committed.  While the Rangers defended their work, a follow-up investigation by the Attorney General of Texas concluded Lucas was a fabulist who had falsely confessed. Lucas' death sentence was commuted to life in prison in 1998. Lucas himself later recanted everything  as a hoax with the exception of his confession to murdering his mother. He died of congestive heart failure in 2001. 

Lucas' case damaged the reputation of the Texas Rangers, caused a re-evaluation in police techniques, and created greater awareness of the possibility of false confessions. Investigators did not consider that the apparently trivial comforts such as steak dinners, milkshakes, and access to television in return for "confession" to crimes of extreme seriousness might encourage prisoners such as Lucas, who had little to lose, to make false confessions. Investigators also let Lucas see the case files so he could "refresh his memory", making it easy to seemingly demonstrate knowledge of facts that only the perpetrator would know. The police also did not record their interviews, making it impossible to know for sure how much information interviewers accidentally gave Lucas unprompted.

Early life 
Henry Lee Lucas was born in a one-room log cabin in Blacksburg, Virginia. He lost an eye at age 10, after it became infected subsequent to a fight with his brother. A friend later described Lucas as a child who would often get attention by displaying frighteningly strange behavior. His mother, Viola, was a prostitute who would force her son to watch her engaging in sex with clients, and who would make him cross-dress in public, purportedly so she could later pimp him out to men and women alike. Eventually, Lucas' schoolteachers complained about the cross-dressing, and a court order put an end to it.

In December 1949, Lucas' alcoholic father, Anderson Lucas, died of hypothermia after drinking to intoxication and collapsing outside during a blizzard. Shortly thereafter, while in the sixth grade, Lucas dropped out of school and ran away from home, drifting around Virginia. He claimed to have committed his first murder in 1951, when he said he strangled 17-year-old Laura Burnsley after she refused his sexual advances. As with most of his confessions, Lucas later retracted this claim.

On June 10, 1954, Lucas was convicted on over a dozen counts of burglary in and around Richmond, Virginia, and was sentenced to four years in prison. He escaped in 1957, was recaptured three days later, and was subsequently released on September 2, 1959.

Matricide 
In late 1959, Lucas traveled to Tecumseh, Michigan, to live with his half-sister, Opal. Around this time, he was engaged to marry a pen pal with whom he had corresponded while incarcerated. When Lucas' mother visited him for Christmas, she disapproved of her son's fiancée and insisted he move back to Blacksburg to take care of her as she grew older. When he refused, they argued repeatedly. These arguments escalated until January 11, 1960, when, according to Lucas, she struck him over the head with a broom, at which point he stabbed her in the neck. Lucas then fled the scene. He subsequently said:

Opal returned later and discovered their mother alive, but in a pool of blood. She called an ambulance, but it arrived too late. The official police report stated that Lucas' mother died of a heart attack precipitated by the assault. Lucas was soon arrested in Ohio on the outstanding Michigan warrant. He claimed to have killed his mother in self-defense, but his claim was rejected and he was sentenced to up to 40 years imprisonment in Michigan for second-degree murder. After serving 10 years in prison, he was released in June 1970 due to prison overcrowding.

Drifter 
  
In 1971, Lucas was convicted of attempting to kidnap three schoolgirls. While serving a five-year sentence for the crime, he established a relationship with a family friend and single mother who had written to him. They married on his release in 1975, but he left the marriage two years later after his stepdaughter accused him of sexually abusing her. Lucas began moving between various relatives, one of whom got him a job in West Virginia, where he established a relationship which ended when his girlfriend's family confronted him about another abuse allegation.

Lucas befriended Ottis Toole and settled in Jacksonville, Florida. There he lived with Toole's parents and became close to his adolescent niece, Frieda "Becky" Powell, who had a mild intellectual disability and had escaped from a juvenile detention center. A period of stability followed, with Lucas working as a roofer, fixing neighbors' cars and scavenging scrap.

Arrest, confession to murders of Powell and Rich 
Powell was put in a state shelter by the authorities after her mother and grandmother died in 1982. Lucas convinced her to run away with him and they lived on the road, eventually traveling to California, where an employer's wife asked them to work for her infirm mother, 82-year-old Kate Rich. However, Rich's family turned the couple out, accusing them of failing to do their jobs and writing checks on Rich's account. 

While hitchhiking, Lucas and Powell were picked up by the minister of a Pentecostal religious commune called "The House of Prayer", located in Stoneburg, Texas. Believing Lucas and the 15-year-old Powell were a married couple, the minister found Lucas a job as a roofer while allowing the couple to stay in a small apartment on the commune where they even attended church services. Powell became argumentative and homesick for Florida; when she turned up absent, Lucas claimed that she left at a truck stop in Bowie, Texas.

In June 1983, Lucas was arrested on charges of unlawful possession of a firearm by Texas Ranger Phil Ryan. Later, he confessed to the murders of Powell and Rich, and led the police to their purported remains, although forensic evidence alone was inconclusive and the coroner stopped short of positively identifying either of them. Lucas' participation in the investigation would serve to boost his credibility in later confessions to other crimes. Lucas later denied involvement, but the consensus is that he did murder Powell and Rich.

False confession spree 
In November 1983, Lucas was transferred to a jail in Williamson County, Texas. He reported that he attempted suicide after receiving rough treatment by the inmates, and claimed that police stripped him naked, denied him cigarettes and bedding, held him in a cold cell, tortured his genitalia, and did not allow him to contact an attorney. In interviews with law enforcement personnel, Lucas confessed to numerous additional unsolved killings. It was thought that there was positive corroboration with Lucas' confessions in 28 unsolved murders, so the Lucas Task Force was established by James B. Adams, the director of the Texas Department of Public Safety (DPS).

The Lucas Task Force officially cleared 213 previously unsolved murders as a result of Lucas' confessions. Lucas received preferential treatment that was extremely lax for someone supposedly thought to be a cunning mass murderer. He was frequently taken to restaurants and cafés, rarely handcuffed, allowed to wander police stations and jails, and he even knew codes for security doors.

Later attempts at determining Lucas' involvement in his confessed crimes were complicated when it was discovered he had been given access to information in the files of cases he was confessing to. There were suggestions that the interview tapes showed that Lucas would read the reactions of those interviewing him and alter what he was saying, thereby making his confessions more consistent with facts known to law enforcement. The most serious allegation against the Lucas Task Force is that they had let Lucas read case files on unsolved crimes, enabling him to come up with convincingly detailed confessions and making it virtually impossible to determine if he had been telling the truth about a relatively large number of the murders.

In 1983, Lucas claimed to have killed an unidentified young woman, later identified as Michelle Busha, along Interstate 90 in Minnesota. When questioned by police, he gave inconsistent details on the way he murdered the victim and was eliminated as a suspect. In 1984, he confessed to the murder of an unidentified girl, referred to at the time as "Caledonia Jane Doe", who was discovered shot to death in a field at Caledonia, New York, on November 10, 1979. Investigators, however, found insufficient evidence to support Lucas' confession. In early 2015, over 35 years later, "Caledonia Jane Doe" was identified through a DNA match as Tammy Alexander. Lucas is also believed to have falsely confessed to the 1980 slaying of Carol Cole in Louisiana. Cole was also unidentified until 2015.

Discredited
Journalist Hugh Aynesworth and others investigated the veracity of Lucas' claims for articles that appeared in The Dallas Times Herald. They calculated that Lucas would have had to use his 13-year-old Ford station wagon to cover  in one month to have committed the crimes police attributed to him. After the story appeared in April 1985 and revealed the flawed methods of the Lucas Task Force, law enforcement opinion began to turn against their claims that crimes had been solved.

The bulk of the Lucas Report was devoted to a detailed timeline of Lucas' claimed murders. The report compared his claims to reliable, verifiable sources for his whereabouts; the results often contradicted his confessions, thus casting doubt on his participation in most of the crimes he had confessed to.   Texas Attorney General Jim Mattox wrote that "when Lucas was confessing to hundreds of murders, those with custody of Lucas did nothing to bring an end to this hoax ... we have found information that would lead us to believe that some officials 'cleared cases' just to get them off the books."

Commutation of death sentence 

Lucas remained convicted of 11 homicides. He had been sentenced to death for one, a then-unidentified woman dubbed as "Orange Socks", whose body was found in Williamson County on Halloween 1979, despite a time sheet recording his presence at work in Jacksonville, Florida, on that day. Lucas was granted a stay on his death sentence after it was discovered that details in his confession came from the case file which he had been given to read. The sentence was commuted to life imprisonment in 1998 by then-Governor George W. Bush. In 2019, "Orange Socks" was officially identified as Debra Jackson, who was aged 23 at the time of her death.

Death
On March 12, 2001, at 11:00 pm, Lucas was found dead in prison from congestive heart failure at age 64. He is buried at Captain Joe Byrd Cemetery in Huntsville, Texas.

Differing opinions 
Lucas' credibility was damaged by his lack of precision: he initially admitted to having killed 60 people, a number he raised to over 100 victims, which police accepted, and then to a figure of 600 that led to him not being taken seriously. Of more than 3,000 murder cases in which he was a suspect, police believed more than 200 cases were committed by him. However, he remained publicized as America's most prolific serial killer, despite denials such as flatly stating, "I am not a serial killer" in a letter to author Shellady.

Some continue to believe, nonetheless, that Lucas was responsible for a massive number of killings. Criminologist Eric W. Hickey cites an unnamed "investigator" who interviewed Lucas several times and concluded that he had probably killed about 40 people. Such assertions were given little credence, with the lawmen involved refusing to corroborate these claims. An experienced Texas Ranger to whom Ryan's team allowed access to Lucas said that although it was obvious to him that Lucas often lied, there was an instance where he demonstrated guilty knowledge. “I remember him trying to cop to one he didn’t do, but there was another murder case where I’ll kiss your butt if he didn’t lead us right to the deer stand where the murder took place. Ain’t no way he could’ve guessed that, and I damn sure I didn’t tell him. I think he did that one.” Other Rangers had similar experiences with Lucas.

DNA evidence has verified that Lucas did not kill 20 of his supposed victims.

Media
There have been several books on the Lucas case. Four narrative films have been made based on his confessions: Confessions of a Serial Killer (1985);  Henry: Portrait of a Serial Killer (1986), in which the title role is played by Michael Rooker;  Henry: Portrait of a Serial Killer, Part II (1996); and the 2009 film Drifter: Henry Lee Lucas. Two documentary films were released in 1995: The Serial Killers and Henry Lee Lucas: The Confession Killer. In 2019, Netflix released a five-part serialized documentary The Confession Killer focusing on the far-reaching consequences of the investigation.

See also
 Sture Bergwall (born 1950) a Swedish "serial killer" whose confessions are now believed to be fabricated.

General:
List of serial killers in the United States
List of serial killers by number of victims

References

Further reading

External links
Biography of Henry Lee Lucas at Courtroom Television Network's Crime Library

1936 births
2001 deaths
20th-century American criminals
American cannibals
American male criminals
American murderers of children
American people convicted of burglary
American people convicted of murder
American people who died in prison custody
American people with disabilities
American prisoners sentenced to death
American rapists
American serial killers
Criminals from Virginia
Male serial killers
Matricides
Necrophiles
People convicted of murder by Michigan
People convicted of murder by Texas
People from Blacksburg, Virginia
People from Tecumseh, Michigan
People with antisocial personality disorder
People with schizophrenia
Prisoners sentenced to death by Texas
Prisoners who died in Texas detention
Recipients of American gubernatorial clemency
Serial killers who died in prison custody